Zagor (Konkani:जागर), (nocturnal vigil ), mainly celebrated in Siolim, in Bardez taluka of Goa is a festival highlighted by dance, drama and music.

See also

References

Festivals in Goa
Tourist attractions in North Goa district